Oakville High School (formerly Oakville Senior High School) is a public comprehensive high school in Oakville, Missouri that is part of the Mehlville R-9 School District.

In the 1960s, the district was struggling to keep up with skyrocking enrollments. Because of this, it was decided that a second high school needed to be built. Oakville High School was founded in 1969, originally being housed at the Jefferson Barracks Building in Mehlville until it moved into its present building at 5557 Milburn Road in 1973.

The school's colors are black and gold and the school mascot is the Tiger. The school uses similar branding to the University of Missouri Tigers, most notably with Oakville using the Missouri Tigers logo to represent them in athletics.

Student Body 
Oakville has a co-educational student body of 1,684 in the 2022-23 school year, increasing by about 10% over the past five school years. Most students come from Bernard Middle School and Oakville Middle School, with a handful coming from Washington Middle School. The racial makeup of the school is approximately 83.5% White, 7.2% Black, 3.6% Asian, and 2.8% Hispanic.

Athletics/Activities
For the 2013–2014 school year, the school offered 27 activities approved by the Missouri State High School Activities Association (MSHSAA): baseball, boys and girls basketball, sideline cheerleading, boys and girls cross country, dance team, field hockey, 11-man football, boys and girls golf, music activities, scholar bowl, boys and girls soccer, softball, speech and debate, boys and girls swimming and diving, boys and girls tennis, boys and girls track and field, boys and girls volleyball, water polo, and wrestling. In addition to its current activities, Oakville students have won several state championships, including:
Girls Water Polo: 2022
Boys soccer: 1976, 2000
Girls soccer: 1981, 1991 
Girls track and field: 1994
Girls softball: 2010
Boys Volleyball: 2011
Wrestling: 1998

On May 12, 2022, the girls waterpolo team defeated Marquette to win the 2022 state championship.  The team was led by offensive player of the year Senior Jenna Wolf with 206
Points and Senior Lauren Manning defensive player of the year.  Brett Walters, an Oakville and University of Missouri graduate, coached the team and was named district coach of the year.

Notable alumni
Jackie Billet, Former U.S. international soccer player
Patrick (Pat) Maroon, NHL player for the Tampa Bay Lightning
 Steve Ralston - Former MLS and USNT soccer player

References

High schools in St. Louis County, Missouri
Public high schools in Missouri
1969 establishments in Missouri
Buildings and structures in St. Louis County, Missouri